The Farman NC.470 (also known as the Centre N.C-470 when Farman was nationalised to form  SNCAC) was a French twin-engined floatplane designed as a crew trainer for the French Navy.  It was used in small numbers for both its intended role as a trainer and as a coastal reconnaissance aircraft at the start of World War II.

Development and design
In 1935, the Farman Aviation Works designed as a private venture the F-470, a twin-engined floatplane intended to be used as a crew trainer by the French Navy. A production order for ten aircraft was placed on 8 March 1936, it being intended that these aircraft would use spare floats, propellers and engines left over from now retired Farman F.168 torpedo bombers.

In 1936, Farman was nationalised, and merged with Hanriot to form the  Société Nationale de Constructions Aéronautiques du Centre or SNCAC. The prototype, now redesignated NC-470, first flew, with a temporary wheeled undercarriage, on 27 December 1937.

The NC.470 was a twin-engined high-winged monoplane of mixed metal and wood construction, with two radial engines mounted on low mounted stub wings. It had a slab sided fuselage, housing the crew of two pilots in a tandem cockpit, a navigator/bombardier in the nose and a radio operator, flight engineer and gunner in the rear fuselage. The aircraft was designed to carry an armament of a single Darne machine gun on an open dorsal cockpit, together with up to 200 kg (440 lb) of bombs.

The first order for 10 NC.470s was completed by mid-1939, together with a single example of the NC.471, powered by a different model of Gnome et Rhône radial engine. Further orders brought production of the NC.470 to a total of 34.

Operational history
While intended as a crew trainer, a shortage of coastal reconnaissance aircraft resulted in NC.470s being drafted into this role, with three NC-470s and the sole NC-471 being used together with three CAMS 55 flying boats to equip Escadrille 3S4 at Berre in August 1939. The NC-470 was also used by the aircrew training school at Hourtin. Fourteen aircraft were captured by Germany during the occupation of Southern France in November 1942.

Variants
NC.470
Main production aircraft. Powered by two  Gnome-Rhône 9Akx radial engines; 34 built.
NC.471
Revised version, powered by  Gnome-Rhône 9Kgr engines; 2 built.
NC.472
Proposed version powered by  Pratt & Whitney R-1340 Wasp engines; unbuilt.

Operators

French Navy

Specifications (NC.471)

See also

References

Bibliography
 Donald, David (editor). The Encyclopedia of World Aircraft. Leicester, UK:Blitz, 1997. .
 Green, William. War Planes of the Second World War: Volume Five Flying Boats. London:Macdonald,1968. .
 Green, William. War Planes of the Second World War: Volume Six Floatplanes. London:Macdonald, 1962.

1930s French military trainer aircraft
NC.470
SNCAC aircraft
High-wing aircraft
Aircraft first flown in 1937
Twin piston-engined tractor aircraft